Pterostylis crassicaulis, commonly known as the alpine swan greenhood, is a plant in the orchid family Orchidaceae and is endemic to south-eastern Australia. It has a rosette of leaves and up to 18 bluish-green and white flowers with dark green stripes. The flowers have a labellum with a dark green, beak-like appendage. It is similar to P. cycnocephala but is more robust and grows at higher altitudes.

Description
Pterostylis crassicaulis, is a terrestrial,  perennial, deciduous, herb with an underground tuber. Four to six stem leaves are wrapped loosely around the flowering spike. The dorsal sepal and petals form a hood or "galea" over the column. The dorsal sepal is curved forwards with the sides turned down. Flowering occurs from December to January.

Taxonomy and naming
The alpine swan greenhood was first formally described in 2008 by David Jones and Mark Clements and given the name Hymenochilus crassicaulis. The description was published in The Orchadian from a specimen collected in the Kosciuszko National Park. In 2010, Gary Backhouse changed the name to Pterostylis crassicaulis, publishing the change in The Victorian Naturalist. The specific epithet (crassicaulis) is derived from the Latin words crassus meaning "thick", "fat" or "stout" and caulis meaning "stalk" or "stem".

Distribution and habitat
The alpine swan greenhood grows in alpine and subalpine grasslands and herbfields in eastern Victoria and on the Southern Tablelands of New South Wales.

References

crassicaulis
Endemic orchids of Australia
Orchids of New South Wales
Orchids of Victoria (Australia)
Plants described in 2008